Passport to Treason is a 1956 British mystery thriller.

It stars Rod Cameron, Lois Maxwell, and Clifford Evans. It was directed by Robert S. Baker and written by Kenneth R. Hayles and Norman Hudis, based on the Manning O'Brine novel of the same name.

Plot 
After the death of a friend of his, a private investigator investigates an organisation that claims to be working for world peace, but turns out to be a front for a crime syndicate.

Cast
Rod Cameron as Mike O'Kelly
Lois Maxwell as Diane Boyd
Clifford Evans as Orlando Syms
Peter Illing as Giorgio Sacchi
Marianne Stone as Miss 'Jonesy' Jones
Douglas Wilmer as Dr. Randolph
John Colicos as Pietro
Ballard Berkeley as Inspector Thredgold
Andrew Faulds as Barrett
Barbara Burke as Katrina
Derek Sydney as Amedeo Sacchi
Trevor Reid as McCombe
Neil Wilson as Sergeant Benson
Peter Swanwick as Cafe Proprietor
Hal Osmond as Club Barman
Salvin Stewart as Travel Agency Manager
Anthony Baird as	Nursing Home Orderly
Tom Bowan as Bargee

Sources 
 "Passport to Treason" at Moviefone.com.
 "Passport to Treason" at Ffilms.org

References

External links
 

1956 films
1950s mystery films
British black-and-white films
British mystery films
Films directed by Robert S. Baker
Films shot at Nettlefold Studios
1950s English-language films
1950s British films